Swing Easy is a Canadian music and variety television program which aired on CBC Television in 1959.

Premise
Regular performers included host Ruth Walker, music group the Rhythm Pals and an orchestra led by Bill Richards.

For example, one episode from 29 August 1959, featured a Shakespeare theme with singer Denyse Angers and musician Peter Appleyard.

Scheduling
This half-hour program was broadcast Saturdays at 7:30 p.m. from 4 July to 26 September 1959.

References

External links
 

CBC Television original programming
1959 Canadian television series debuts
1959 Canadian television series endings
1950s Canadian music television series
Black-and-white Canadian television shows